Puerto Rico Highway 169 (PR-169) is a road located in Guaynabo, Puerto Rico. This highway begins at PR-1 in Río and ends at PR-20 in Frailes, passing through downtown Guaynabo.

Major intersections

See also

 List of highways numbered 169

References

External links
 

169
Guaynabo, Puerto Rico